Something Like Happiness (Czech title: Štěstí ) is a 2005 Czech movie directed by Bohdan Sláma. It is about finding hope in the midst of disappointment by three young people who grew up in the same run-down block of flats and are now coming of age. The film won the Golden Seashell at the San Sebastian Film Festival.

Cast
 Anna Geislerová - Dasha
 Pavel Liška - Toník
 Tatiana Vilhelmová - Monika
 Marek Daniel - Jára
 Zuzana Kronerová - Teta
 Vanda Hybnerová - Ženuška

Awards
Seven Czech Lions (2005)

External links

Bohdan Slama´s latest film premieres in Prague
Something Like Happiness wins top award at San Sebastian film fest

2005 films
2000s Czech-language films
2005 drama films
Czech Lion Awards winners (films)
Golden Kingfisher winners
Czech drama films
2000s Czech films